Steve Nolan (birth unknown) is an Irish professional rugby league footballer who played in the 2000s. He played at representative level for Ireland, and at club level for Treaty City Titans.

International honours
Nolan won a cap for Ireland while at Treaty City Titans 2006 1-cap (sub).

References

Living people
Ireland national rugby league team players
Irish rugby league players
Place of birth missing (living people)
Rugby league players from County Limerick
Treaty City Titans players
Year of birth missing (living people)